The Safe Side is a series of safety videos and other products, founded in 2005 by Julie Clark, founder of The Baby Einstein Company, & John Walsh, host of America's Most Wanted and co-founder of the National Center for Missing and Exploited Children. Each DVD and CD provides important safety tips. There was also a NetSmartz DVD & CD released in 2006 along with Internet Safety, Plus badge stickers, Wristbands, gear, id kits, & event kits for schools.

Videos
Safe Side Superchick, played by Angela Shelton, the star of the show, stars in both videos:
 The Safe Side Stranger Safety
Released In 2005, teaches Hot Tips about stranger safety with a music video & three Safety Badges included.
 The Safe Side Internet Safety
Released in Fall 2006, teaches Hot Tips of the internet with two Safe Side music videos, bloopers, and a Safe Side wristband.

Music
The Safe Side Cool Tunes, released in 2006 has ten safety songs like Safe Side Close.

Books
Keep Close. Keep Cool. was the only Safe Side book released.

References

External links
 Official website

2005 films
2006 films
2000s superhero films
Films about kidnapping
Child safety
Films about the Internet
2000s English-language films
American superhero films
American direct-to-video films
2000s American films